Manu and Yemo were a duo in Proto-Indo-European mythology In the creation myth. Manu killed Yemo as a foundational part of the origin of the universe.  is sometimes also interpreted as a primordial hermaphrodite.

The comparative analysis of different Indo-European tales has led scholars to reconstruct an original Proto-Indo-European creation myth involving twin brothers, * ('Man') and * ('Twin'), as the progenitors of the world and mankind, and a hero named * ('Third') who ensured the continuity of the original sacrifice.

Although some thematic parallels can be made with Ancient Near East (the primordial couple Adam and Eve), and even Polynesian or South American legends, the linguistic correspondences found in descendant cognates of *Manu and *Yemo make it very likely that the myth discussed here has a Proto-Indo-European (PIE) origin.

Following a first paper on the cosmogonical legend of Manu and Yemo, published simultaneously with Jaan Puhvel in 1975 (who pointed out the Roman reflex of the story), Bruce Lincoln assembled the initial part of the myth with the legend of the third man Trito in a single ancestral motif.

Since the 1970s, the reconstructed motifs of Manu and Yemo, and to a lesser extent that of Trito, have been generally accepted among scholars.

Overview

Reconstruction 
There is no scholarly consensus as to which of the variants is the most accurate reconstruction of the Proto-Indo-European cosmogonic myth. Bruce Lincoln's reconstruction of the Proto-Indo-European motif known as "Twin and Man" is supported by a number of scholars such as Jaan Puhvel, J. P. Mallory, Douglas Q. Adams, David W. Anthony, and, in part, Martin L. West. Although some thematic parallels can be made with traditions of the Ancient Near East (the twins Abel and Cain and their brother Seth), and even Polynesian or South American legends, Lincoln argues that the linguistic correspondences found in descendant cognates of *Manu and *Yemo make it very likely that the myth has a Proto-Indo-European origin. According to Edgar C. Polomé, "some elements of the [Scandinavian myth of Ymir] are distinctively Indo-European", but the reconstruction proposed by Lincoln "makes too [many] unprovable assumptions to account for the fundamental changes implied by the Scandinavian version".

Creation myth 
Lincoln reconstructs a creation myth involving twin brothers, * ("Man") and * ("Twin"), as the progenitors of the world and humankind, and a hero named * ("Third") who ensured the continuity of the original sacrifice. Regarding the primordial state that may have preceded the creation process, West notes that the Vedic, Norse and, at least partially, the Greek traditions give evidence of an era when the cosmological elements were absent, with similar formula insisting on their non-existence: "neither non-being was nor being was at that time; there was not the air, nor the heaven beyond it..." (Rigveda), "...there was not sand nor sea nor the cool waves; earth was nowhere nor heaven above; Ginnunga Gap there was, but grass nowhere..." (Völuspá), "...there was Chasm and Night and dark Erebos at first, and broad Tartarus, but earth nor air nor heaven there was..." (The Birds).

To the third man Trito, the celestial gods then offer cattle as a divine gift, which is stolen by a three-headed serpent named * ("serpent"; and the Indo-European root for negation). Trito first suffers at his hands, but the hero eventually manages to overcome the monster, fortified by an intoxicating drink and aided by the Sky-Father. He eventually gives the recovered cattle back to a priest for it to be properly sacrificed. Trito is now the first warrior, maintaining through his heroic actions the cycle of mutual giving between gods and mortals.

First Warrior 
To the third man Trito, the celestial gods offer cattle as a divine gift, which is stolen by a three-headed serpent named * ('serpent'; and the Indo-European root for negation).

Trito first suffers at his hands, but fortified by an intoxicating drink and aided by a helper-god (the Storm-God or *Haner, 'Man'), together they go to a cave or a mountain, and the hero finally manages to overcome the monster. Trito then gives the recovered cattle back to a priest for it to be properly sacrificed. He is now the first warrior, maintaining through his heroic deeds the cycle of mutual giving between gods and mortals.

Three Functions 
According to Lincoln, Manu and Yemo seem to be the protagonists of "a myth of the sovereign function, establishing the model for later priests and kings", while the legend of Trito should be seen as "a myth of the warrior function, establishing the model for all later men of arms". He has thus interpreted the narrative as an expression of the priests's and kings's attempt to justify their role as indispensable for the preservation of the cosmos, and therefore as essential for the organization of society. The motif indeed recalls the Dumézilian tripartition of the cosmos between the priest (in both his magical and legal aspects), the warrior (the Third Man), and the herder (the cow).

Primeval hermaphrodite 

Hermann Güntert, stressing philological parallels between the Germanic and Indo-Iranian texts, argued in 1923 for an inherited Indo-European motif of the creation of the world from the sacrifice and dismemberment of a primordial androgyne.

Some scholars have proposed that the primeval being Yemo was depicted as a two-folded hermaphrodite rather than a twin brother of Manu, both forming indeed a pair of complementary beings entwined together. The Germanic names Ymir and Tuisto were understood as twin, bisexual or hermaphrodite, and some myths give a sister to the Vedic Yama, also called Yamī ('Twin'). The primordial being may therefore have self-sacrificed, or have been divided in two, a male half and a female half, embodying a prototypal separation of the sexes that continued the primordial union of the Sky Father (Dyēus) with the Mother Earth (Dhéǵhōm).

Interpretations 
According to Lincoln, Manu and Yemo seem to be the protagonists of "a myth of the sovereign function, establishing the model for later priests and kings", while the legend of Trito should be interpreted as "a myth of the warrior function, establishing the model for all later men of arms". The myth indeed recalls the Dumézilian tripartition of the cosmos between the priest (in both his magical and legal aspects), the warrior (the Third Man), and the herder (the cow).

The story of Trito served as a model for later cattle raiding epic myths and most likely as a moral justification for the practice of raiding among Indo-European peoples. In the original legend, Trito is only taking back what rightfully belongs to his people, those who sacrifice properly to the gods. The myth has been interpreted either as a cosmic conflict between the heavenly hero and the earthly serpent, or as an Indo-European victory over non-Indo-European people, the monster symbolizing the aboriginal thief or usurper.

Some scholars have proposed that the primeval being Yemo was depicted as a two-fold hermaphrodite rather than a twin brother of Manu, both forming indeed a pair of complementary beings entwined together. The Germanic names Ymir and Tuisto were understood as twin, bisexual or hermaphrodite, and some myths give a sister to the Vedic Yama, also called Twin and with whom incest is discussed. In this interpretation, the primordial being may have self-sacrificed, or have been divided in two, a male half and a female half, embodying a prototypal separation of the sexes.

Legacy 

Cognates deriving from the Proto-Indo-European First Priest *Manu ("Man", "ancestor of mankind") include the Indic Manu, legendary first man in Hinduism, and Manāvī, his sacrificed wife; the Germanic Mannus (PGmc *Mannaz), mythical ancestor of the West Germanic tribes; and the Persian Manūščihr (from Aves. Manūš.čiθra), a Zoroastrian high priest of the 9th century AD. From the name of the sacrificed First King *Yemo ("Twin") derive the Indic Yama, god of death and the underworld; the Avestan Yima, king of the golden age and guardian of hell; the Norse Ymir (from PGmc *Jumijaz), ancestor of the giants (jötnar); and most likely Remus (from Proto-Latin *Yemos or *Yemonos, with the initial y- shifting to r- under the influence of Rōmulus), killed in the Roman foundation myth by his twin brother Romulus. Cognates stemming from the First Warrior *Trito ("Third") include the Vedic Trita, the Avestan Thrita, and the Norse þriði.

Many Indo-European beliefs explain the origin of natural elements as the result of the original dismemberment of Yemo: his flesh usually becomes the earth, his hair grass, his bone yields stone, his blood water, his eyes the sun, his mind the moon, his brain the clouds, his breath the wind, and his head the heavens. The traditions of sacrificing an animal to disperse its parts according to socially established patterns, a custom found in Ancient Rome and India, has been interpreted as an attempt to restore the balance of the cosmos ruled by the original sacrifice.

The motif of Manu and Yemo has been influential throughout Eurasia following the Indo-European migrations. The Greek, Old Russian (Poem on the Dove King) and Jewish versions depend on the Iranian, and a Chinese version of the myth has been introduced from Ancient India. The Armenian version of the myth of the First Warrior Trito depends on the Iranian, and the Roman reflexes were influenced by earlier Greek versions.

Linguistic evidence

Manu and Yemo 
Cognates deriving from the Proto-Indo-European First Priest *Manu ('Man', 'ancestor of humankind') include the Indic Mánu, legendary first man in Hinduism, and Manāvī, his sacrificed wife; the Germanic Mannus (from Germ. *Manwaz), mythical ancestor of the West Germanic tribes; and the Persian Manūščihr (from Av. Manūš.čiθra, 'son of Manuš'), Zoroastrian high priest of the 9th century AD.

From the name of the sacrificed First King *Yemo ('Twin') derive the Indic Yama, god of death and the underworld; the Avestan Yima, king of the golden age and guardian of hell; the Norse Ymir (from Germ. *Yumiyáz), ancestor of the giants (jötnar); and most likely Remus (from Proto-Latin *Yemos), killed in the Roman foundation myth by his twin brother Rōmulus. Latvian jumis ('double fruit'), Latin geminus ('twin') and Middle Irish emuin ('twin') are also linguistically related.

Trito and Ngwhi 
Cognates stemming from the First Warrior *Trito ('Third') include the Vedic Trita, the hero who recovered the stolen cattle from the serpent Vṛtrá; the Avestan Thraētona ('son of Thrita'), who won back the abducted women from the serpent Aži Dahāka; and the Norse þriði ('Third'), one of the names of Óðinn. Other cognates may appear in the Greek expressions trítos sōtḗr (τρίτος σωτήρ; 'Third Saviour'), an epithet of Zeus, and tritogḗneia (τριτογήνεια; 'Third born' or 'born of Zeus'), an epithet of Athena; and perhaps in the Slavic mythical hero Troyan, found in Russian and Serbian legends alike.

*Ngwhi, a term meaning 'serpent', is also related to the Indo-European root for negation (*ne-). Descendent cognates can be found in the Iranian Aži, the name of the inimical serpent, and in the Indic áhi ('serpent'), a term used to designate the monstrous serpent Vṛtrá, both descending from Proto-Indo-Iranian *aj'hi.

Comparative mythology 
Many Indo-European beliefs explain aspects of human anatomy from the results of the original dismemberment of Yemo: his flesh usually becomes the earth, his hair grass, his bone yields stone, his blood water, his eyes the sun, his mind the moon, his brain the clouds, his breath the wind, and his head the heavens. The traditions of sacrificing an animal before dispersing its parts following socially established patterns, a custom found in Ancient Rome and India, has been interpreted as an attempt to restore the balance of the cosmos ruled by the original sacrifice.

In the Indo-Iranian version of the myth, his brother Manu also sacrifices the cow, and from the parts of the dead animal are born the other living species and vegetables. In the European reflexes, however, the cow (represented by a she-wolf in the Roman myth) serves only as a provider of milk and care for the twins before the creation. This divergence may be explained by the cultural differences between the Indo-Iranian and European branches of the Indo-European family, with the former still strongly influenced by pastoralism, and the latter much more agricultural, perceiving the cow mainly as a source of milk. According to Lincoln, the Indo-Iranian version best preserves the ancestral motif, since they lived closer to the original Proto-Indo-European pastoral way of life.

Indo-Iranian

Creation myth 
Mánu ('Man, human') appears in the Rigveda as the first sacrificer and the founder of religious law, the Law of Mánu. He is the brother (or half-brother) of Yama ('Twin'), both presented as the sons of the solar deity Vivasvat. The association of Mánu with the ritual of sacrifice is so strong that those who do not sacrifice are named amanuṣāḥ, which means 'not belonging to Mánu', 'unlike Mánu', or 'inhuman'. The Song of Puruṣa (another word meaning 'man') tells how the body parts of the sacrificed primeval man led to the creation of the cosmos (the heaven from his head, the air from his navel, the earth from his legs) and the Hindu castes (the upper parts becoming the upper castes and the lower parts the commoners). In the later Śatapatha Brāhmana, both a primordial bull and Mánu's wife Manāvī are sacrificed by the Asuras (demi-gods). According to Lincoln, this could represent an independent variant of the original myth, with the figure of Yama laying behind that of Manāvī.

After a religious transformation led by Zarathustra around the 7th–6th centuries BC that degraded the status of prior myths and deities, *Manuš was replaced in the Iranian tradition with three different figures: Ahriman, who took his role as first sacrificer; Manūščihr ('son' or 'seed of Manuš'), who replaced him as ancestor of the priestly line; and Zarathustra himself, who took his role as priest par excellence. Manūščihr is described in the Greater Bun-dahišnīh as the ancestor of all Mōpats ('High Priests') of Pars, and it has been proposed that *Manuš was originally regarded as the First Priest instead of Zarathustra by pre-Zoroastrian tribes.

The Indo-Iranian tradition portrays the first mortal man or king, *YamHa, as the son of the solar deity, *Hui-(H)uas-uant. Invoked in funeral hymns of the Rigveda, Yama is depicted as the first man to die, the one who established the path towards death after he freely chose his own departure from life. Although his realm was originally associated with feasting, beauty and happiness, Yama was gradually portrayed as a horrific being and the ruler of the Otherworld in the epic and puranic traditions. Some scholars have equated this abandonment (or transcendence) of his own body with the sacrifice of Puruṣa. In a motif shared with the Iranian tradition, which is touched in the Rigveda and told in later traditions, Yama and his twin sister Yamī are presented as the children of the sun-god Vivasvat. Discussing the advisability of incest in a primordial context, Yamī insists on having sexual intercourse with her brother Yama, who rejects it, thus forgoing his role as the creator of humankind.

In pre-Zoroastrian Iran, Yima was seen as the first king and first mortal. The original myth of creation was indeed condemned by Zarathustra, who makes mention of it in the Avesta when talking about the two spirits that "appeared in the beginning as two twins in a dream ... (and) who first met and instituted life and non-life". Yima in particular is depicted as the first to distribute portions of the cow for consumption, and is explicitly condemned for having introduced the eating of meat. After a brief reign on earth, the king Yima was said in a later tradition to be deprived of his triple royal nimbus, which embodied the three social classes in Iranian myths. Mithra receives the part of the Priest, Thraētona that of the Warrior, and Kərəsāspa that of the Commoner. The saga ends with the real dismemberment of Yima by his own brother, the daiwic figure Spityura. In another myth of the Younger Avesta, the primal man Gayōmart (Gaya marətan; 'Mortal Life') and the primeval world ox Gōšūrvan are sacrificed by the destructive spirit Ahriman (Aŋra Mainyu, 'Evil Spirit'). From the ox's parts came all the plants and animals, and from Gayōmart's body the minerals and humankind. In the Vīdēvdāt, Yima is presented as the builder of an underworld, a sub-terrestrial paradise eventually ruled by Zarathustra and his son. The story, giving a central position to the new religious leader, is once again probably the result of a Zoroastrian reformation of the original myth, and Yima might have been seen as the ruler of the realm of the dead in the early Iranian tradition. Norbert Oettinger argues that the story of Yima and the Vara was originally a flood myth, and the harsh winter was added in due to the dry nature of Eastern Iran, as flood myths didn't have as much of an effect as harsh winters. He has argued that the Videvdad 2.24's mention of melted water flowing is a remnant of the flood myth, and mentions that the Indian Flood Myths originally had their protagonist as Yama, but it was changed to Manu later.

Legacy 
The motif of Manu and Yemo has been influential throughout Eurasia following the Indo-European migrations. The Greek, Old Russian (Poem on the Dove King) and Jewish versions depend on the Iranian, and a Chinese version of the myth has been introduced from Ancient India. The Armenian version of the myth of the First Warrior Trito depends on the Iranian, and the Roman reflexes were influenced by earlier Greek versions.

Baltic mythology records a fertility deity Jumis, whose name means 'pair, double (of fruits)'. His name is also considered a cognate to Indo-Iranian Yama, and related to Sanskrit yamala 'in pairs, twice' and Prakrit yamala 'twins'. Ranko Matasović cites the existence of Jumala as a female counterpart and sister of Jumis in Latvian dainas (folksongs), as another fertility deity, and in the same vein, Zmago Smitek mentioned the pair as having "pronounced vegetational characteristics". Jumis, whose name can also mean 'double ear of wheat', is also considered a Latvian chthonic deity that lived "beneath the plowed field".

Later Iranian tradition (Pahlavi) attests a brother-sister pair named Jima (Yima) and Jimak (Yimak). Yimak, or Jamag, is described as Yima's twin sister in the Bundahishn from Central Iran. Yima consorts with his sister Yimak to produce humankind, but is later killed by Azi Dahaka.

The name Yama is attested as a compound in personal names of the historical Persepolis Administrative Archives, such as Yamakka and Yamakšedda (from Old Persian *Yama-xšaita- 'majestic Yama', modern Jamshid).

Nuristani deity Imra is also considered a reflex of Indo-Iranian Yama. The name Imra is thought to derive from *Yama-raja "King Yama", a name possibly cognate to the Bangani title Jim Raza 'god of the dead'. He is also known as Mara "Killer, Death". This name may have left traces in other Nuristani languages: Waigali Yamrai, Kalash (Urtsun) imbro, Ashkun im'ra, Prasun yumr'a and Kati im'ro - all referring to a "creator god". This deity also acts as the guardian to the gates of hell (located in a subterranean realm), preventing the return to the world of the living - a motif that echoes the role of Yama as the king of the underworld.

Linguist and comparativist Jaan Puhvel proposed that the characters of "Man" and "Twin" are present in Proto-Latin under the names of Remus (from *Yemo(no)s) and Romulus.

Following Puhvel's line of argument, Belarusian scholar Siarhiej Sanko attempted to find a Proto-Baltic related pair, possibly named Jumis ("twin") and Viras ("male, hero"). He saw a connection with (quasi-pseudo-)historical Prussian king Widewuto and his brother Bruteno. Related to them is a pair of figures named Wirschaitos and Szwaybrutto (Iszwambrato, Schneybrato, Schnejbrato, Snejbrato) which he interprets as "Elder" and "His Brother", respectively. These latter two would, in turn, be connected to the worship, by the Prussians, of stone statues erected during their expansion in the 12th and 13th centuries.

See also 
 Indo-European cosmogony
 Proto-Indo-European mythology
 Romulus and Remus
 Numa Pompilius
 Trito

Notes

Bibliography

References 

Divine twins
Indo-European religion
Proto-Indo-European mythology
Origin myths
Reconstructed words
LGBT themes in mythology